Shir Appeal is Tufts University’s only mixed-gender Jewish a cappella group. Founded in 1995 with assistance from the Jewish Agency, Shir Appeal is one of the nation’s oldest collegiate Jewish a cappella groups.  The group sings music from a wide range of genres, including Israeli rock and pop, traditional and liturgical Jewish songs, Jewish world music, and English music with strong Jewish themes.  Though based at Tufts University outside Boston, Shir Appeal has gone on tour to numerous areas in the United States, including New York City, Philadelphia, Washington DC, Los Angeles, San Francisco, Miami, and Chicago, as well as the New England and Boston areas. Shir Appeal has been on Best of College a Cappella (BOCA) four times.  It was the first non-secular a cappella group to be recognized on BOCA, and the only Jewish group to have ever been featured on it.

History
The group was founded in 1995 by Liz Perlman Bodian, Jenn Madan Cohen, Jessica Cooper and Jonathan Oriole.  It is formally a student group at Tufts University Hillel, and the presidency of the group is a position on the Hillel student board.  In the same year it was founded, Shir Appeal hosted a Jewish A Cappella festival at Tufts University.  Shir Appeal was the first group to have an album produced by John Clark, himself a graduate of the Tufts Amalgamates.  Many of Shir Appeal’s early arrangements were composed by John Clark ("Laila Tov Europa", "Yamei Hatom"), as well as members of the Tufts Beelzebubs.  Being at Tufts, a “fertile crescent” of a cappella, Shir Appeal quickly gained expertise in all aspects of a cappella.  Tufts’ University president, Lawrence Bacow (2001–2011), also hosted the group on numerous occasions at the president’s house (Gifford House) on the Tufts Campus.  Shir Appeal is also a regular participant at an annual Jewish A Cappella festival at the Jewish Theological Seminary in New York City, held in February.  The group does not participate in competitions, but has received praise from the Recorded A Cappella Review Board (RARB) for its CDs. Their album Linguistics received an honorable mention for best album of 2015 from the Recorded A Cappella Review Board.

Name
The name ‘Shir Appeal’ (Heb: שיר הפיל) is a pun on the group’s sheer appeal and the Hebrew meaning of the words “Shir haPeel,” which means ‘Song of the Elephant’.  Tufts' mascot is Jumbo the elephant.

Religion
While Shir Appeal is a Jewish a cappella group, their repertoire draws on both religious music and secular Israeli rock and pop music.  The vast majority of their songs are in Hebrew, though it has sung in Hebrew, English, Yiddish, Spanish, Ladino, Russian, Portuguese, Arabic, and Luganda.  The members of Shir Appeal come from different religious backgrounds, including Jews of different levels of observance as well as non-Jewish members.

Albums
As is common in collegiate a cappella, many of Shir Appeal’s album names are puns.
 Man, Women, and Shevitz (1999)
 Mah Pitom? (What Are You Saying?) (2000)
 Unpealed (2002)
 Transliteration (2004)
 Zoozin’ (2006)
 Peal. Play. Win! (2009)
 Electric Peal (2011)
 The Elephant in the Room (2013)
 Linguistics (2014)
 Perspective (2016)
 Common Threads (2018)
 Either Or (2020)

Compilations & Awards

Trivia
 The side spine text on the album Transliteration is misprinted “Translitertaion.”
 Shir Appeal was the first a cappella group to make use of a vocoder in “Y’hei Shlama” from the album Transliteration.
 The title of the song “Dirah Esrim V’Shesh” means “Apartment 26.”  John Clark, Shir Appeal’s producer, lives in Apartment 26.
 In 2005, a radio DJ (DJ Rick) from Radio Manila in the Philippines contacted Shir Appeal asking for a cappella music.  Shir Appeal sent him a number of tracks including When You Believe from the album Ma Pitom.  The track played on his radio show in Manila a few months later.  An engaged couple residing in The Philippines heard the song on the radio, and later used it in their wedding in 2008.
 Shir Appeal’s music has been aired on Chagiga, a weekly Jewish Music radio show broadcast on WERS out of Emerson College.
 Shir Appeal’s signature version of Yerushalayim Shel Zahav uses 4/4 time, rather than the ¾ time in which the song was originally composed.  With its unique arrangement, the song has gone on to be one of Shir Appeal’s most performed songs ever.
 Cantors in Los Angeles, CA and Fair Lawn, NJ have performed solo renditions with Shir Appeal of the song.
 One of the original soloists, Nili Riemer, graduated with a dual degree from Tufts and the New England Conservatory of Music. She is now a professional opera singer and has appeared in performances around the world.
 Shir Appeal has opened twice for the Jewish artist Neshama Carlebach, daughter of Shlomo Carlebach, once at Tufts Hillel, and once in Swampscott, MA.  After encouragement from Neshama herself, Shir Appeal performed its rendition of her song “Yehi Shalom” at its opening act at Tufts Hillel in 2005.
 The group has also performed in a Hannukah concert with Jewish singer/composer Jeff Klepper in 2007.
 Shir Appeal’s “Abayudaya Shabbat” is based on music collected by Tufts Hillel Rabbi and Executive Director, Jeffrey Summit.  His album, based on field research as an ethnomusicologist with the Abayudaya Jewish community in Uganda, was nominated for a Grammy award in 2005.  Abayudaya Rabbi Gershom Sizomu visited Tufts University in 2000 and was deeply moved when Shir Appeal performed the music of his community for him.
 Shir Appeal was the first a cappella group to perform a Hebrew rap song (Lazuz), in 2005.

External links
 Shir Appeal’s official website
 RARB reviews of Shir Appeal albums

References

Tufts University
Collegiate a cappella groups
Musical groups established in 1995